GİRSAN is a Turkish firearm manufacturing company, mainly focused on manufacturing pistols and shotguns. Its firearms are used worldwide by civilians, police and military.

History
GIRSAN Gun Industry was established in Giresun, Turkey in 1993. Factory building located in Giresun Bulancak Industrial Zone on an area of more than 30,000 square meters. GİRSAN products are used by Military, Police and other government owned authorities. In addition, Girsan delivers their products to more than 55 countries all over the world.

Manufacturing
In the United States their distributor;  European American Armory  imports all their product lines from Girsan.

Product line

Pistols
 Regard M.C.  (9 mm)
 Compact M.C. (9 mm)
 Tuğra (Regard Six) (9 mm)
 MC R9  (9 mm)
 Regard MC GEN 3 (9 mm)
Regard MC GEN 4 (9 mm)
 MC 39 (9 mm)
 MC 13 (9 mm)
 MC 14 (.380)
 MC 28 (9 mm or .40 or .380)
 MC 28S (9 mm or .40 or .380)
 MC 28T (9 mm or .40 or .380)
 MC 9 (9 mm)
 MC 9T (9 mm)
 MC 9S (9 mm)
 MC 9 XTREME (9 mm)
 MC 1911 (9 mm or 45ACP)
 MC 1911 S (45ACP) 
 MC 1911 C  (9 mm or 45ACP)
 MC 1911 SC   (9 mm or 45ACP)
 MC 1911 MATCH  (9 mm or 45ACP)
 MC 1911 S10 (10 mm)
 MC P35 (9 mm)
 MC P35 MATCH (9 mm)

Shotguns
 MC 312 (12ga)
 MC 312 TACTICAL
 MC 312 SLUG
 MC 312 S1
 MC 312 S1 SLUG
 MC 3512 
 MC 312 SPORTING
 MC 3512 GOBBLER

Infantry rifles 

 MC4

Notes

Defence companies of Turkey
Firearm manufacturers of Turkey
Manufacturing companies of Turkey